Donald Alexander Finkel (October 21, 1929 – November 15, 2008) was an American poet best known for his unorthodox styles and "curious juxtapositions".

Life
Finkel was born in New York City on October 21, 1929. He grew up in the Bronx, and aspired to be a sculptor as a youth. He attended the University of Chicago, only to be expelled for smoking marijuana. Finkel attended Columbia University, where he was awarded a bachelor's degree in philosophy in 1952. He earned a master's degree in English from Columbia in 1953.

He taught at the Iowa Writers' Workshop at the University of Iowa and at Bard College in Annandale-on-Hudson, New York, prior to accepting a faculty position at Washington University in St. Louis in 1960. He taught at Washington University until 1991, and was poet-in-residence emeritus there until his death.  Mr. Finkel’s wife, Constance Urdang, a novelist and poet, died in 1996. In addition to his son, Tom, of St. Louis, he is survived by two daughters, Liza Finkel of Portland, Ore., and Amy Finkel of St. Louis; a half-brother, David Finkel of Manhattan; and two grandchildren.

Poetry
De Witt Bell, in a 1964 review, called Finkel's work Simeon, "a book of great élan, robust in world view and vigorous in style. Both the poet and the poems seems to be enjoying themselves."

Finkel was sent to Antarctica in 1968, as part of a scientific expedition sponsored by the National Science Foundation to  send artists to Antarctica. The trip spawned a book-length poem, "Adequate Earth", in 1972, and the subject reappeared in his 1978 book, Endurance: An Antarctic Idyll.

Finkel's wrote his poetry in free verse, juxtaposing different subjects against each other. Some of his poetry was extremely lengthy, with single pieces filling a volume. Finkel strayed from abstraction and used common language in his writing. He would interlace his poetry with sections taken from a wide range of works, including the writings of authors including Lenny Bruce, Admiral Richard Evelyn Byrd, Albert Camus and Franz Kafka to create what The New York Times described as a "multilayered, sculptural bricolage through which Mr. Finkel expanded the reader's sense of what was possible in the genre." Some of Finkel's best-known poems include his 1968 work Answer Back about Mammoth Cave, Adequate Earth, and his 1987 work The Wake of the Electron which was inspired by the story of sailor Donald Crowhurst, who died in 1969 while competing in the Sunday Times Golden Globe Race.

The 14 books of poetry and other works he published include Simeon (1964), A Joyful Noise (1966), The Garbage Wars (1970), A Mote in Heaven’s Eye (1975), Endurance: An Antarctic Idyll (1978), Going Under (1978), What Manner of Beast (1981) and Not So the Chairs: Selected and New Poems (2003). He translated A Splintered Mirror: Chinese Poetry From the Democracy Movement with Carolyn Kizer, which was published in 1991.

“The Invention of Meaning”

In the beginning was the hand 
and the poem of the hand, 
a breathless trope, a floating hieroglyph, 
seamless as water.

Then the hand spoke, and the hand said 
“Let there be meaning,” and the meaning sang: 
“Let there be love,” and the hand 
shaped itself another hand of clay.

Now, where there had been 
but one meaning, there were two. 
So the hands wrestled all night 
till they saw it was pointless.

So together they shaped themselves 
a cunning tongue, to arbitrate. 
Now, where there had been two meanings, 
there were three.

And the hands wrung one another, 
abashed, and the tongue took over.

– Donald Finkel
From: Natural Bridge

Sculpture and death
Before his death, Finkel returned to sculpture, creating pieces from buttons, bottles and other found objects, in a process he called "dreckolage".

He died at age 79 on November 15, 2008 at his home in St. Louis, Missouri of complications of Alzheimer's disease.

References

External links
The Donald Finkel Papers at Washington University in St. Louis

American male poets
Bard College faculty
Columbia Graduate School of Arts and Sciences alumni
People from the Bronx
University of Chicago alumni
Washington University in St. Louis faculty
Deaths from dementia in Missouri
Deaths from Alzheimer's disease
1929 births
2008 deaths
20th-century American poets
20th-century American male writers